Adriaen van Nieulandt (1587, Antwerp- buried July 7, 1658, Amsterdam) was a Dutch painter, draughtsman and engraver of the Baroque period.

Biography

His father (Adriaen van Nieulandt the elder) was born to a family of artists of Flemish origin from Antwerp. In 1589 he moved his family to Amsterdam, probably to flee the Fall of Antwerp. This could have been because they were Protestants or simply for economic reasons, as the art market in the Northern Netherlands was doing very well at the time. His sons Adriaen Jr., Willem van Nieulandt II and Jacob van Nieulandt all became painters. Adriaen Jr. was a pupil of Pieter Isaacsz (1569–1625) and Frans Badens (1571–1618) in Amsterdam. According to Houbraken, he specialized in painting statuary and landscapes. According to Het Gulden Cabinet, he also made many scenes from the Old Testament.

Public collections
 Rijksmuseum, Amsterdam
 Amsterdam Museum, Amsterdam
 Frans Hals Museum, Haarlem
 Museum de Fundatie, Zwolle
 Hessisches Landesmuseum Darmstadt, Darmstadt
 Herzog Anton Ulrich Museum, Braunschweig

References

External links

 Web Gallery of Art – Biography

1587 births
1658 deaths
Dutch Golden Age painters
Dutch male painters
Painters from Amsterdam
Artists from Antwerp